The United Democratic Party (UDP) is an opposition liberal party in Tanzania. The party is an observer at Liberal International.

Electoral performance
At the 2000 legislative elections, the party 2 out of 269 seats in the National Assembly. In the presidential elections of the same day, its candidate John Cheyo won 4.2% of the vote.

The party didn't field a presidential candidate in the 14 December 2005 election, but did win one seat in National Assembly elections held on the same day.

See also
 Liberalism
 Contributions to liberal theory
 Liberalism worldwide
 List of liberal parties
 Liberal democracy

References

1992 establishments in Tanzania
Liberal parties in Tanzania
Political parties established in 1992
Political parties in Tanzania